Democrats 66 (abbreviated D66) is a social liberal political party in the Netherlands, which positions itself in the centre of the political spectrum. It is a member of the Liberal International (LI) and the Alliance of Liberals and Democrats for Europe (ALDE).

The name of the party refers to its year of foundation, 1966. Initially, its main objective had been to democratise the Dutch political system, but it developed a broader social liberal ideology over time. In the 1967 general election, the party won 7 out of 150 seats in the House of Representatives. No new party had ever gained that many seats before. The party was in government from 1973 to 1977, 1981 to 1982, 1994 to 2002, 2003 to 2006 and 2017 to present. It currently holds 24 seats in the House of Representatives, 7 seats in the Senate and 2 seats in the European Parliament.

D66 is especially popular among people who hold a university degree, and its voters are mostly concentrated in larger cities and in municipalities with an above-average number of wealthy residents. The party supplies a relatively large proportion of mayors, who are appointed rather than elected.

It has a progressive agenda on social issues (LGBT rights, gender equality, etc.) and a conservative agenda on economic issues (economic liberalism, restricted social welfare system, etc.)

Currently, the party is led by Sigrid Kaag, who was elected party leader on 4 September 2020. Annelien Bredenoord, Jan Paternotte and Sophie in 't Veld are serving as the party's parliamentary leaders in the Senate, the House of Representatives and the European Parliament respectively.

Name and logo 
At its foundation, the party was called Democrats '66 (abbreviated D'66). The name referred to the party's goal of radical democratisation and to the year of foundation, which was supposed to convey a modern image. In 1981, the apostrophe was dropped: the name had become a successful political brand, but the year no longer conveyed a modern image.

History

1966–1986: Early years 
Democrats 66 was founded on 14 October 1966 by a group of 44 people. Its founders were described as homines novi, although 25 of the 44 had previously been members of another political party. The initiators were Hans van Mierlo, a journalist for the Algemeen Handelsblad, and Hans Gruijters, a municipal councillor in Amsterdam. Van Mierlo became the party's political leader. The foundation of the party was preceded by the "Appeal 1966" on October 10, in which the founders appealed to the people of the Netherlands to re-take their democratic institutions. The party renounced the 19th-century political ideologies, which dominated the political system and sought to end pillarisation. It called for radical democratisation of the Dutch political system, and for pragmatic and scientific policy-making.

The party participated in the 1967 general election, with Hans van Mierlo as its lijsttrekker (top candidate). The party won an unprecedented seven seats in the House of Representatives. In the 1971 general election, the party won an additional four seats and it formed a shadow cabinet with the Labour Party (PvdA) and the Political Party of Radicals (PPR). In the 1972 general election, the three parties formed a political alliance called the "Progressive Agreement" (PAK) and presented the common electoral program "Turning Point '72" (Keerpunt '72).

In the election, D66 lost nearly half its seats, leaving only six. The alliance became the largest political force in the country, but it did not gain a majority. After long cabinet formation talks, the three PAK-parties formed an extra-parliamentary cabinet joined by progressive members of the Anti-Revolutionary Party (ARP) and the Catholic People's Party (KVP). The cabinet was led by Labour politician Joop den Uyl. Co-founder Hans Gruijters became Minister of Housing and Spatial Planning. After the formation talks, Van Mierlo left politics, feeling that his political position within the parliamentary party was untenable. Van Mierlo was replaced by Jan Terlouw, who became the new parliamentary leader.

In the period 1972–1974, the party lost a dramatic number of members (from 6,000 to 300) and polled very poorly in the 1974 provincial elections. The party also lost half of its senators in the 1974 Senate election. At one of the party congresses, a motion was put forth to abolish the party. A majority of the members voted in favour, but the two-thirds majority was not reached. In reaction, Terlouw started a campaign to revitalise the party, involving a membership drive and a petition to the electorate. He emphasised issues other than democratic reform and gave the party a more liberal orientation. The party doubled its membership in 1975 and won two additional seats in the 1977 general election, despite losing all its seats in the Senate in the same year.

In the 1981 general election, D66 gained 17 seats. The party formed a government with the Labour Party and the Christian Democratic Appeal (CDA), with Terlouw as Minister of Economic Affairs. The cabinet was characterised by the personal and ideological conflicts between Prime Minister Dries van Agt (CDA) and Minister of Social Affairs Joop den Uyl (PvdA). The cabinet fell nine months after it was formed, when the Labour Party left the cabinet. D66 and the CDA continued to govern in a caretaker government. In the subsequent 1982 general election, D66 lost two-thirds of its support, and was left with only 6 seats. After the election, Terlouw left politics and was replaced by Maarten Engwirda. The party was confined to opposition.

1986–2006: Purple cabinets and demise 
In 1986, Van Mierlo returned to politics. He emphasised democratic reform as the core issue of the party and wanted to end the polarisation between the Labour Party and the People's Party for Freedom and Democracy (VVD), so that it would be possible to form a government without the CDA. He led the party in the 1986 general election and won 9 seats. In the 1989 election, the party won 12 seats and was asked to join the formation talks of a CDA–PvdA–D66 coalition. While the PvdA preferred to form a government with D66, the CDA did not. Ultimately, D66 was excluded from the coalition, because it was not necessary to include them to reach a majority in parliament.

Despite being in opposition, D66 adopted a constructive approach towards the government. They were rewarded for this in the 1994 general election, in which the party doubled its number of seats to 24. D66 was able to form its preferred coalition: the "purple government", which included both the social democratic PvdA and the conservative liberal VVD. Van Mierlo was appointed Minister of Foreign Affairs. As advocated by D66, the first Kok cabinet initiated progressive legislation, such as the introduction of same-sex marriage and the legalisation of euthanasia. The moderately liberal economic policies of the cabinet were also seen as a great success.

Shortly before the 1998 general election, Van Mierlo stepped back and Minister of Health Els Borst became the new top candidate. D66 lost ten seats in the election, while its coalition partners gained ground at the cost of D66. The second Kok cabinet continued. Although D66 was technically not needed for a majority in parliament, it was seen as the glue that kept the PvdA and the VVD together. Borst stepped down as party leader and became Deputy Prime Minister and Minister of Health. Thom de Graaf led the party in the House of Representatives. From within the party, there were calls for a more explicit progressive liberal course. In 1999, a constitutional reform that would allow for referendums to be held was rejected by the Senate, because a group of VVD dissidents had voted against it. In response, D66 left the cabinet. After the subsequent formation talks, D66 returned to the cabinet in return for a temporary referendum law and directly elected mayors.

In the 2002 general election, the tide had turned against the purple government, and the right-wing populist Pim Fortuyn List (LPF) gained considerable ground. The three purple parties lost an unprecedented 43 seats. D66 was left with only 7 seats. The first Balkenende cabinet, consisting of CDA, LPF and VVD, lasted only three months. In the 2003 general election, D66 lost another seat, leaving only 6. De Graaf stepped down and was succeeded by Boris Dittrich. After long formation talks between the CDA and the PvdA failed, a second Balkenende cabinet was formed, which included the CDA, the VVD and D66.

In return for investments in environment and education, and a special Minister for Governmental Reform, D66 supported the centre-right reform cabinet and some of its more controversial legislation. In May 2005, the Senate rejected a constitutional reform that would allow a directly elected mayor. The legislation had been introduced by the second Kok cabinet, but it was unable to get a two-thirds majority because the Labour Party was opposed the electoral system proposed by Minister for Governmental Reform Thom de Graaf. De Graaf resigned, but the rest of the ministers retained their positions as D66 was promised more investment in public education and the environment. A special party congress was called to ratify this so-called "Easter Agreement" (Paasakkoord). 2,600 members (20 percent of total membership) were present and the congress was broadcast live on television. The congress agreed to remain in cabinet by a large majority. Alexander Pechtold replaced De Graaf as Minister for Governmental Reform. Laurens Jan Brinkhorst, the Minister of Economic Affairs, became Deputy Prime Minister.

2006–2016: Pechtold leadership 
In February 2006, Dittrich stepped down as parliamentary leader, because he did not agree with the government's decision to send the Dutch armed forces to the southern province of Uruzgan in Afghanistan. D66 voted against the government's proposal together with the Socialist Party and GroenLinks. Dittrich stated that the mission to send troops was not a reconstruction mission (as the government and the majority of the Dutch parliament claimed), but a military operation. Lousewies van der Laan replaced Dittrich. In May 2006, D66 polled particularly badly in the 2006 municipal elections. D66 began to lose a considerable number of members, some of whom founded deZES, another radical democratic, progressive liberal party. During a special party congress on 13 May 2006, a motion was put forth demanding the withdrawal of D66 from the cabinet, but it was rejected. In June 2006, an internal election was held in order to choose the new party leader. The election was won by Alexander Pechtold.

During the special parliamentary debate on the naturalisation process of Ayaan Hirsi Ali, D66 supported a motion of no confidence against Minister for Integration Rita Verdonk. As D66 was a junior coalition partner, this caused a crisis in the second Balkenende cabinet. The cabinet refused to remove Verdonk from her position. Lousewies van der Laan, parliamentary leader of D66, felt that the D66 faction could no longer support the cabinet and stated that the cabinet had to resign. On 3 July 2006, the two D66 ministers Alexander Pechtold and Laurens Jan Brinkhorst resigned, causing the second Balkenende cabinet to fall.

In October 2006, just before the D66 party congress and its 40th anniversary as a party, D66 founder Hans van Mierlo asked the question whether D66 still had political legitimacy. He believed that many errors were made in recent history and that only the acceptance of these errors could provide for any credibility for D66. Van Mierlo declared his support for party leader Pechtold, who in his view could provide for such credibility.

Since 2008, the party has performed quite well in the opinion polls, ranging from 10 to 26 seats, compared to only 3 seats in the House of Representatives. In the 2009 European Parliament election, the party won 11% of the votes and 3 seats, two more than in the previous election. The news programme Nova attributed this increase to the leadership of Alexander Pechtold, who was considered "the leader of the opposition" at the time. Under the leadership of Pechtold, the party has taken strong stances against the Party for Freedom (PVV) of Geert Wilders. In the 2010 general election, D66 increased its representation to 10 seats. In the 2012 general election, the party further increased its number of seats to 12. Since 2008, the party has experienced a significant increase in party membership, from 10,000 to 25,000 in 2015.

In the 2017 general election, D66 won 19 seats in the House of Representatives and formed a centre-right coalition government with the VVD, CDA and Christian Union (CU). Kajsa Ollongren was appointed second Deputy Prime Minister in the third Rutte cabinet.

2018–present: Kaag leadership 
In October 2018, Alexander Pechtold announced his retirement from politics. He was replaced by Rob Jetten as parliamentary leader, but the position of party leader remained vacant. In September 2020, Minister for Foreign Trade and Development Cooperation Sigrid Kaag was elected the new party leader and top candidate for the 2021 general election. Despite the fact that the opinion polls had predicted D66 to lose seats, the party won 24 seats in the 2021 election, becoming the second largest party in the House of Representatives.

Ideology 

The ideology of D66 is a highly contested subject within the party and the question is tied to the reason for its existence. There are two currents within the party, namely the radical democrats and the progressive liberals. Although sometimes antagonistic, these two currents currently complement each other as both emphasise the self-realisation of the individual. The Radical League and the Free-thinking Democratic League, two early 20th century parties are historic exponents of these two traditions.

Factions

Radical democrats 
The first party congress emphasised radical democratisation of Dutch society and the political system. Its ideal was a two-party system. To obtain this, it wanted to reform the electoral system after the American first past the post model. The electoral reform was gradually moderated as the party now favours German-style mixed member proportional representation. In this system, a national party-list election is used to make a first-past-the-post election representative to the nationwide vote. This radical democratisation was combined with a pragmatic and anti-dogmatic attitude towards politics. Hans van Mierlo, the party's leader between 1966 and 1972 and between 1986 and 1998 and the party's figurehead, was an important exponent of this tendency within the party.

Progressive liberals 
D66's progressive liberal section has historically been much weaker than its radical democratic wing. Under Jan Terlouw between 1972 and 1982, D66 began to emphasise new issues like the environment, public education and innovation. He called D66 a fourth current, next to social democracy, Christian democracy and the conservative liberalism of the VVD. In 1998, the group Opschudding called for a progressive liberal course for the party. In the party's manifesto adopted in 2000, the party explicitly adopted a progressive liberal image. National political reasons explain the usage of the label "social-liberal" since the more right-leaning VVD describes itself as the liberal party.

Positions 
Some of the party's most important positions include:
 D66 is in favour of a mixed economy combining market economics and government intervention. D66 is also a proponent of increased flexibility in the labour market and tax cuts for the lower and middle classes.
 D66 proposes to increase government spending on education and innovation, for instance increases in teachers' salaries. D66 wants the education sector to be deregulated and introduce more competition in the sector.
 The environment is an important issue for the party. D66 favours a carbon price and more investment in sustainable energy to combat global warming, but opposes the right to hunt and sees hunting only as last resort for wildlife damage control.
 D66 is a socially liberal party. The first Kok cabinet in which it participated introduced several liberal reforms in the past, such as the legalisation of euthanasia, same-sex marriage and prostitution.
 D66 is a proponent of democratic reform. It favours electoral reforms such as a binding referendum, abolition of the Senate and direct election of prime ministers and mayors.
 D66 favours a Federal Europe and more European cooperation on issues such as the environment, immigration policy and foreign policy.

Electorate 
Although supporters of political parties are no longer fixed and election results fluctuate, D66 is overall strong and concentrated in the  Randstad conurbation, while also getting its votes in and around university towns. In the 2014 municipal elections, D66 became the largest party in many major cities including Amsterdam, The Hague, Utrecht, Tilburg, Groningen, Enschede, Apeldoorn, Haarlem, Amersfoort and Arnhem.

Electoral results

House of Representatives

Senate

European Parliament

Representation

Members of the Fourth Rutte cabinet

Members of the States General

Members of the House of Representatives 
Current members of the House of Representatives since the 2021 general election:

 Jan Paternotte, parliamentary leader
 Salima Belhaj
 Vera Bergkamp
 Marijke van Beukering
 Raoul Boucke
 Faissal Boulakjar
 Hind Dekker-Abdulaziz
 Lisa van Ginneken
 Tjeerd de Groot
 Kiki Hagen
 Alexander Hammelburg
 Romke de Jong

 Hülya Kat
 Jeanet van der Laan
 Paul van Meenen
 Wieke Paulusma
 Anne-Marijke Podt
 Rens Raemakers
 Sjoerd Sjoerdsma
 Joost Sneller
 Sjoerd Warmerdam
 Hanneke van der Werf
 Steven van Weyenberg
 Jorien Wuite

Members of the Senate 
Current members of the Senate since the 2019 Senate election:

 Annelien Bredenoord, parliamentary leader
 Joris Backer
 Petra Stienen
 Boris Dittrich
 Henk Pijlman
 Carla Moonen
 Peter van der Voort

Representation in EU institutions

Members of the European Parliament 
The D66 delegation is part of the Renew Europe group in the European Parliament. Prior to the first European elections in 1979, D66's appointed MEPs were part of the Socialist Group, before switching to Non-Inscrits from 1979 to 1984, and the LDR/ELDR/ALDE group since 1989.

Current members of the European Parliament since the 2019 European Parliament election:

 Sophie in 't Veld, delegation leader
 Samira Rafaela

Members of the Committee of the Regions 
In the European Committee of the Regions, the Democrats 66 party sits in the Renew Europe CoR group, with two full and two alternate members for the 2020–2025 mandate:

  Michiel Rijsberman, second vice-president of the Renew Europe group and coordinator of the Commission for Territorial Cohesion Policy (COTER).
 Ilse Zaal
  Robert van Asten (alternate)
 Robert Strijk (alternate)

King's commissioners

Provincial councillors 
Since the 2019 provincial elections, D66 has 41 representatives in the provincial councils:

Organisation 
The highest organ of the D66 is the General Assembly, in which every member can participate. It convenes multiple times per year. It appoints the party board and has the last say over the party program. The party list, including the party's parliamentary leader, for the Senate, House of Representatives, European Parliament candidates are elected directly by the members. The party has between 250 and 300 branches all over the Netherlands.

Leadership

Party leaders 

 Hans van Mierlo (14 September 1966 – 1 September 1973)
 Jan Terlouw (1 September 1973 – 8 September 1982)
 Laurens Jan Brinkhorst (8 September 1982 – 10 November 1982)
 Maarten Engwirda (10 November 1982 – 25 January 1986)
 Hans van Mierlo (25 January 1986 – 15 February 1998)

 Els Borst (15 February 1998 – 30 May 1998)
 Thom de Graaf (30 May 1998 – 22 January 2003)
 Boris Dittrich (22 January 2003 – 3 February 2006)
 Alexander Pechtold (24 June 2006 – 6 October 2018)
 Sigrid Kaag (4 September 2020 – present)

Chairpersons 

 Hans van Mierlo (14 September 1966 – 16 February 1967)
 Gerben Ringnalda (16 February 1967 – 18 November 1967)
 Hans van Lookeren Campagne (18 November 1967 – 14 December 1968)
 Jan Beekmans (14 December 1968 – 7 November 1971)
 Ruby van der Scheer (7 November 1971 – 11 March 1973)
 Jan ten Brink (11 March 1973 – 6 November 1976)
 Jan Glastra van Loon (6 November 1976 – 27 October 1979)
 Henk Zeevalking (27 October 1979 – 11 September 1981)
 Cees Spigt (Ad interim) (11 September 1981 – 14 November 1981)
 Jan van Berkom (14 November 1981 – 30 October 1982)
 Jacob Kohnstamm (30 October 1982 – 20 May 1986)
 Olga Scheltema (Ad interim) (20 May 1986 – 1 November 1986)
 Saskia van der Loo (1 November 1986 – 29 October 1988)
 Michel Jager (29 October 1988 – 3 November 1990)

 Ries Jansen (3 November 1990 – 28 November 1992)
 Wim Vrijhoef (28 November 1992 – 23 November 1996)
 Tom Kok (23 November 1996 – 20 November 1999)
 Gerard Schouw (20 November 1999 – 16 November 2002)
 Alexander Pechtold (16 November 2002 – 31 March 2005)
 Jan Hoekema (Ad interim) (31 March 2005 – 21 May 2005)
 Frank Dales (21 May 2005 – 2 March 2007)
 Gerard Schouw (Ad interim) (2 March 2007 – 12 May 2007)
 Ingrid van Engelshoven (12 May 2007 – 9 March 2013)
 Fleur Gräper (9 March 2013 – 13 September 2015)
 Letty Demmers (13 September 2015 – 6 October 2018)
 Anne-Marie Spierings (6 October 2018 – 13 November 2021)
 Victor Everhardt (13 November 2021 – present)

Parliamentary leaders 

 Parliamentary leaders in the House of Representatives
 Hans van Mierlo (23 February 1967 – 1 September 1973)
 Jan Terlouw (1 September 1973 – 11 September 1981)
 Laurens Jan Brinkhorst (11 September 1981 – 10 November 1982)
 Maarten Engwirda (10 November 1982 – 3 June 1986)
 Hans van Mierlo (3 June 1986 – 22 August 1994)
 Gerrit Jan Wolffensperger (22 August 1994 – 21 November 1997)
 Thom de Graaf (21 November 1997 – 19 May 1998)
 Els Borst (19 May 1998 – 30 May 1998)
 Thom de Graaf (30 May 1998 – 22 January 2003)
 Boris Dittrich (22 January 2003 – 3 February 2006)
 Lousewies van der Laan (3 February 2006 – 30 November 2006)
 Alexander Pechtold (30 November 2006 – 9 October 2018)
 Rob Jetten (9 October 2018 – 18 March 2021)
 Sigrid Kaag (18 March 2021 – 25 May 2021)
 Rob Jetten (25 May 2021 – 28 September 2021)
 Sigrid Kaag (28 September 2021 – 10 January 2022)
 Jan Paternotte (11 January 2022 – present)

 Parliamentary leaders in the Senate
 Bert Schwarz (11 May 1971 – 17 September 1973)
 Paula Wassen-van Schaveren (17 September 1973 – 17 September 1974)
 Doeke Eisma (17 September 1974 – 20 September 1977)
 No representation (20 September 1977 – 16 September 1980)
 Jan Glastra van Loon (16 September 1980 – 3 December 1985)
 Jan Vis (3 December 1985 – 1 March 1995)
 Eddy Schuyer (1 March 1995 – 12 June 2007)
 Gerard Schouw (12 June 2007 – 17 June 2010)
 Hans Engels (22 June 2010 – 7 June 2011)
 Roger van Boxtel (7 June 2011 – 9 June 2015)
 Thom de Graaf (9 June 2015 – 26 June 2018)
 Hans Engels (26 June 2018 – 11 June 2019)
 Annelien Bredenoord (11 June 2019 – present)

Top candidates 

 Lijsttrekker – General election
 Hans van Mierlo – 1967 · 1971 · 1972
 Jan Terlouw – 1977 · 1981 · 1982
 Hans van Mierlo – 1986 · 1989 · 1994
 Els Borst – 1998
 Thom de Graaf – 2002 · 2003
 Alexander Pechtold – 2006 · 2010 · 2012 · 2017
 Sigrid Kaag – 2021

 Lijsttrekker – Senate election
 Jan Glastra van Loon – 1980 · 1981 · 1983
 Jan Vis – 1986 · 1987 · 1991
 Eddy Schuyer – 1995 · 1999 · 2003
 Gerard Schouw – 2007
 Roger van Boxtel – 2011
 Thom de Graaf – 2015
 Annelien Bredenoord – 2019

 Lijsttrekker – European Parliament election
 Aar de Goede – 1979
 Doeke Eisma – 1984
 Jan-Willem Bertens – 1989 · 1994
 Lousewies van der Laan – 1999
 Sophie in 't Veld – 2004 · 2009 · 2014 · 2019

Party board 
 Victor Everhardt, chair
 Nadia Arsieni, secretary
 Rob Meijer, treasurer
 Maartje Jansen, board member (international relations)
 Hester Duursema, board member (communications and recruitment)
 Wietske Veltman, board member (association and education)

Linked organisations 
The youth wing of D66 is called the Young Democrats (abbreviated JD). It has produced several prominent active members of D66, such as former MP Boris van der Ham. The JD is a member of European Liberal Youth and the International Federation of Liberal Youth.

D66 is a co-founder of the Netherlands Institute for Multiparty Democracy, a democracy assistance organisation of seven Dutch political parties. The Hans van Mierlo Foundation is the party's policy institute.

International affiliation 
D66 is a member of the Liberal International and of the Alliance of Liberals and Democrats for Europe (ALDE). D66 joined the Liberal and Democratic Reformists (LDR) group in 1989. It became a full member of the European Liberal Democrat and Reform Party (ELDR) in 1994 and a full member of the Liberal International in 1986.

Relationships to other parties 
In recent elections, political commentators have positioned D66 at the centre of the political spectrum. This offers the party a lot of possibilities for co-operation with other parties in the Dutch political landscape. Historically, D66 has often co-operated in cabinets with the Labour Party (PvdA). They were in four cabinets together (Den Uyl, Van Agt II, Kok I and Kok II), and formed a shadow cabinet in the early seventies. However, there have been heavy tensions between D66 and the PvdA on three occasions: in 1981, when D66 decided to continue to govern with the Christian Democratic Appeal (CDA) after the PvdA had left the first Van Agt cabinet; in 1989, when the PvdA formed the third Lubbers cabinet without D66; and in 2003, when D66 joined the second Balkenende cabinet.

Ideologically, the social liberal D66 is linked to People's Party for Freedom and Democracy (VVD), although VVD is considered a party of conservative liberalism. This resulted in five coalition governments (Kok I, Kok II, Balkenende II, Rutte III and Rutte IV). Both D66 and the VVD are members of the Alliance of Liberals and Democrats for Europe (ALDE) and their respective members in the European Parliament are part of the Renew Europe group.

See also 
 Liberal democracy
 Liberalism in the Netherlands
 Water Natuurlijk

Notes

References

External links
  
 International website 
 Profile at DNPP 

 
1966 establishments in the Netherlands
Alliance of Liberals and Democrats for Europe Party member parties
Centrist parties in the Netherlands
European federalist parties
Green political parties in the Netherlands
Liberal International
Political parties established in 1966
Political parties in the Netherlands
Pro-European political parties in the Netherlands
Progressive parties
Social liberal parties
Organisations based in The Hague